Edward Gustavus Hudson (1791–1851) was an Irish priest in the middle of the 19th century: he was Dean of Armagh from 1842 until 1851.

Hudson was educated at Trinity College, Dublin. A member of the Royal Dublin Society, he died on 14 August 1851 at Glenville, County Cork.

References

1791 births
Alumni of Trinity College Dublin
Irish Anglicans
Deans of Armagh
1851 deaths